Itea may refer to:

Itea (plant), a genus of plants
Itea ilicifolia, holly-leaved sweetspire
Itea virginica, Virginia sweetspire

 Places in Greece (Ἰτέα):

Itea, Phocis, a town and a municipality in the southeastern part of Phocis, on the Gulf of Corinth

Itea, Evros, a village in the southeastern part of the Evros regional unit
Itea, Florina, a village in the northcentral part of Florina regional unit
Itea, Grevena, a village in the eastern part of Grevena regional unit
Itea, Ioannina, a village in the eastern part of Ioannina regional unit
Itea, Karditsa, a village in the northeastern part of Karditsa regional unit, part of Fyllo.
Itea, Larissa, a village in the northeastern part of Larissa regional unit

ITEA as an acronym may refer to:
 International Tuba Euphonium Association
 International Technology Education Association
 International Test and Evaluation Association
 Information Technology for European Advancement (ITEA2)

See also

 Sitia, Crete, called Ητεία (Itia, Itea, Etea) in the ancient period